Gennaro "Gino" Latilla (7 November 1924, Bari – 11 September 2011, Florence) was an Italian singer. In 1954 he won the Sanremo Music Festival in partnership with Giorgio Consolini, with the song "Tutte le mamme".

References

Further reading
 Gino Castaldo (editor), Dizionario della canzone italiana, Milano, Curcio, 1990, article Latilla, Gino
 Eddy Anselmi, Festival di Sanremo. Almanacco illustrato della canzone italiana, edizioni Panini, Modena, article Gino Latilla

Italian pop singers
1924 births
2011 deaths
People from Bari

Sanremo Music Festival winners
20th-century Italian male singers